The 1834 New York gubernatorial election was held from November 3 to 5, 1834 to elect the Governor and Lieutenant Governor of New York. This was the first fall election in which the Whig Party participated.

Candidates
Incumbent Governor William L. Marcy was re-nominated by the Democratic Party to run against the nominee of the Whig Party, future governor William H. Seward. The Democratic Party nominated the incumbent John Tracy for Lieutenant Governor.

Seward had had to fight hard for the nomination; those considered included Amos P. Granger, Daniel C. Verplanck, and others.  Eventually Seward, then 33 years old, emerged as the consensus choice. The Whig Party nominated state assemblyman Silas M. Stilwell for Lieutenant Governor.

Campaign

During the campaign, the Democratic press charged that Seward was too young to serve; the Whig press countered by giving examples of famous people, including DeWitt Clinton, who had served at young ages.

Results
The Democratic ticket of Marcy and Tracy was elected.

Sources
Result: The Tribune Almanac 1838

1834
New York
Gubernatorial election
November 1834 events